This is a list of 147 species in Phloeotribus, a genus of crenulate bark beetles in the family Curculionidae.

Phloeotribus species

 Phloeotribus acaciae Wood & Bright, 1992 c
 Phloeotribus americanus Dejean, 1837 c
 Phloeotribus amplus Wood, 1977c c
 Phloeotribus antiguus Bright & Poinar, 1994 c
 Phloeotribus argentinae Blackman, 1943c c
 Phloeotribus argentinensis Wood & Bright, 1992 c
 Phloeotribus armatus Blandford, 1897a c
 Phloeotribus asiaticus Pjatnitskii, 1934 c
 Phloeotribus asperatus Blandford, 1897a c
 Phloeotribus asperulus Eggers, 1943a c
 Phloeotribus atavus Wood, 1969b c
 Phloeotribus atlanticus Schedl, 1951m c
 Phloeotribus australis Schedl, 1953f c
 Phloeotribus biguttatus Blandford, 1897a c
 Phloeotribus boliviae Blackman, 1943c c
 Phloeotribus bolivianus Eggers, 1933b c
 Phloeotribus brasiliensis Wood & Bright, 1992 c
 Phloeotribus brevicollis Wood & Bright, 1992 c g
 Phloeotribus carinatus Burgos-Solorio & Equihua in Burgos-Solorio, Equihua Martínez, González Hernández, Carrillo Sánchez & c
 Phloeotribus caucasicus Reitter, 1891a c
 Phloeotribus championi Wood & Bright, 1992 c
 Phloeotribus chiliensis Eggers, 1942a c
 Phloeotribus collaris Chapuis, 1869 c
 Phloeotribus contortus Schedl, 1973d c
 Phloeotribus contractus Chapuis, 1869 c
 Phloeotribus corsicus Guillebeau, 1893 c
 Phloeotribus crenatus Wood & Bright, 1992 c
 Phloeotribus cristatus Wood & Bright, 1992 c
 Phloeotribus cylindricus Schedl, 1951m c
 Phloeotribus dalmatinus Schedl (Eggers in), 1979j c
 Phloeotribus demessus Blandford, 1897a c
 Phloeotribus dentifrons (Blackman, 1921) i c g b
 Phloeotribus despectus Schedl, 1966f c
 Phloeotribus destructor Wood, 1969b c
 Phloeotribus discrepans Blandford, 1897a c
 Phloeotribus dubius Eichhoff, 1868c c
 Phloeotribus eggersi Schedl, 1962q c
 Phloeotribus erinaceus Schedl, 1973d c
 Phloeotribus erosus Schedl, 1951m c
 Phloeotribus fici Wood, 1977c c
 Phloeotribus fraxini Wood & Bright, 1992 c
 Phloeotribus frontalis (Olivier, 1795) i c g b
 Phloeotribus furvus Wood, 1969b c
 Phloeotribus geminus Wood, 1983a c
 Phloeotribus harringtoni Blackman, 1943a c
 Phloeotribus hebes Schedl, 1978c c
 Phloeotribus hercegovinensis Wood & Bright, 1992 c
 Phloeotribus hirtellus Schedl, 1966f c
 Phloeotribus hirticulus Wood, 2007 c
 Phloeotribus hirtus Wood, 1977c c
 Phloeotribus hispidulus Eggers, 1934a c
 Phloeotribus huapiae Wood & Bright, 1992 c
 Phloeotribus hylurgulus Schedl, 1959i c
 Phloeotribus hystrix Wood, 1969b c
 Phloeotribus incanus Wood, 2007 c
 Phloeotribus ingae Wood, 1977c c
 Phloeotribus insularis Eggers, 1940a c
 Phloeotribus jujuya Blackman, 1943c c
 Phloeotribus lecontei Schedl, 1962 i c b
 Phloeotribus levis Wood, 1977c c
 Phloeotribus liminaris (Harris, 1852) i c g b  (peach bark beetle)
 Phloeotribus lineatus Eggers, 1951 c
 Phloeotribus lineigera Guillebeau, 1893 c
 Phloeotribus longipilus Eggers, 1943a c
 Phloeotribus major Stebbing, E.P., 1907a c
 Phloeotribus manni Blackman, 1943c c
 Phloeotribus marginatus Eggers, 1933a c
 Phloeotribus maroccanus Wood & Bright, 1992 c
 Phloeotribus maurus Wood, 1969b c
 Phloeotribus mayeti Wood & Bright, 1992 c
 Phloeotribus mexicanus Lacordaire, 1866 c
 Phloeotribus minor Wood, 1977c c
 Phloeotribus mixtecus Bright, 1972b c
 Phloeotribus muricatus Wood & Bright, 1992 c
 Phloeotribus nahueliae Wood & Bright, 1992 c
 Phloeotribus nanus Wood, 1974a c
 Phloeotribus nebulosus Wood, 1977c c
 Phloeotribus neglectus Schedl, 1964m c
 Phloeotribus nitidicollis Wood & Bright, 1992 c
 Phloeotribus novateutonicus Wood & Bright, 1992 c
 Phloeotribus nubilus Blandford, 1897a c
 Phloeotribus obesus Kirsch, 1875 c
 Phloeotribus obliquus Chapuis, 1869 c
 Phloeotribus occidentalis Balachowsky (Bedel in), 1949a c
 Phloeotribus oleae  c
 Phloeotribus oleiphilus Del Guercio, 1925a c
 Phloeotribus opacicollis Eggers, 1943a c
 Phloeotribus opimus Wood, 1969b c
 Phloeotribus ovatus Wood & Bright, 1992 c
 Phloeotribus pacificus Bright, 1982a c
 Phloeotribus pectinicornis Balachowsky, 1949a c
 Phloeotribus perfoliatus Wood & Bright, 1992 c
 Phloeotribus perniciosus Wood, 1982a c
 Phloeotribus peruensis Schedl, 1942 c
 Phloeotribus peyerimhoffi Wood & Bright, 1992 c
 Phloeotribus piceae Swaine, 1911 i c b
 Phloeotribus picipennis Eggers, 1943a c
 Phloeotribus pilifer Wood, 2007 c
 Phloeotribus pilula Wood & Bright, 1992 c
 Phloeotribus pistaciae Pfeffer (Wichmann, H.E. in), 1972b c
 Phloeotribus porteri Bruch, 1914b c
 Phloeotribus profanus Schedl, 1963d c
 Phloeotribus pruni Wood, 1956 i c
 Phloeotribus pseudocristatus Wood & Bright, 1992 c
 Phloeotribus pseudoscabricollis Atkinson, 1989 i c b
 Phloeotribus puberulus Wood & Bright, 1992 c
 Phloeotribus pubifrons Guillebeau, 1893 c
 Phloeotribus puncticollis Chapuis, 1869 c
 Phloeotribus quercinus Wood, 1969b c
 Phloeotribus remorsus Wood, 1977c c
 Phloeotribus rhododactylus Wood & Bright, 1992 c g
 Phloeotribus rudis Eichhoff, 1868c c
 Phloeotribus rugulosus Eggers, 1951 c
 Phloeotribus scabratus Blandford, 1897a c
 Phloeotribus scabricollis (Hopkins, 1916) i c g
 Phloeotribus scaraboeoides (Bernard, P-J., 1788) c g
 Phloeotribus schedli Wood, 2007 c
 Phloeotribus schoenbachi Kirsch, 1866 c
 Phloeotribus serratus Eggers, 1943a c
 Phloeotribus setulosus Eichhoff, 1868c c
 Phloeotribus sharpi Guillebeau, 1893 c
 Phloeotribus simplex Wood, 1967b c
 Phloeotribus simplicidens Wood, 1977c c
 Phloeotribus sodalis Blandford, 1897a c
 Phloeotribus spinipennis Eggers, 1930a c
 Phloeotribus spinulosus Wood & Bright, 1992 c
 Phloeotribus squamatus Wood, 1969b c
 Phloeotribus squamiger Wood, 1977c c
 Phloeotribus striatus Wood & Bright, 1992 c
 Phloeotribus subcostatus Eggers, 1943a c
 Phloeotribus subovatus Blandford, 1987a c
 Phloeotribus sulcifrons Blandford, 1897a c
 Phloeotribus suturalis Eggers, 1943a c
 Phloeotribus tetricus Wood, 1977c c
 Phloeotribus texanus Schaeffer, 1908 i c b
 Phloeotribus transversus Chapuis, 1869 c
 Phloeotribus truncatus Wood, 2007 c
 Phloeotribus tuberculatus Wood & Bright, 1992 c
 Phloeotribus uniseriatus Eggers, 1943a c
 Phloeotribus venezuelensis Wood & Bright, 1992 c
 Phloeotribus vesculus Wood, 1977c c
 Phloeotribus vestitus Eggers, 1943a c
 Phloeotribus villosulus Lacordaire, 1866 c
 Phloeotribus vinogradovi Semenov, 1902 g
 Phloeotribus willei Schedl, 1937g c
 Phloeotribus woytkowskii Wood, 2007 c
 Phloeotribus zimmermanni Wickham, H.F., 1916 c

Data sources: i = ITIS, c = Catalogue of Life, g = GBIF, b = Bugguide.net

References

Phloeotribus
Articles created by Qbugbot